Denneville is a former commune in the Manche department in north-western France. On 1 January 2019, it was merged into the new commune Port-Bail-sur-Mer.

Heraldry

See also
Communes of the Manche department

References

Former communes of Manche
Populated coastal places in France